Bacalar Chico National Park and Marine Reserve (BCNPMR) is a protected area and UNESCO World Heritage Site on the northern part of Ambergris Caye in Belize.

History
BCNPMR had its inception in the early 1990s when the Broadhead Group sought to construct a community for retirees in northern Ambergris Caye.  An environmental impact assessment by the Belize Center for Environmental Studies found the Bacalar Chico region to have an unusually high biodiversity for a barrier island.  In 1995, the Natural Resources Management Plan and the Protection Project first developed a comprehensive management plan for the various vegetative assemblages within Belize.  This plan specifically recommended the extreme northern portion of the island for inclusion based on the merits of its salt marsh ecosystem. At this time, fishermen in San Pedro and the mainland village of Sarteneja were growing concerned over the accelerating depletion of marine resources on Ambergris Caye.

Community support for the creation of a reserve in Bacalar Chico was largely influenced by the Hol Chan Marine Reserve’s success in generating revenue from entrance fees and sustaining tour guiding operations.  In 1995, the San Pedro NGO Greenreef Environmental Institute developed a management plan for the area, and a year later Bacalar Chico was officially recognized as a national park and marine reserve.  The park remained protected in name only for the next three years.  The Coastal Zone Management Authority and Institute (CZMAI) began paying salaries and operational expenses for marine protected areas designated under the World Heritage criteria in 1999.  Funding from the CZMAI expired in 2004, when the financial and managerial responsibility for BCNPMR was transferred to the Government of Belize, which now furnishes US$100,000 a year for operational expenses and the salaries of the park's four rangers.  An additional 10% of the park's budget is provided through small grants from organizations including the Nature Conservancy and the MesoAmerican Barrier Reef Systems Project.

Governance
BCNPMR comprises two distinct legal areas with their own set of laws.  The national park is managed under the National Park Systems Act, with the ministerial responsibility held by the Ministry of Natural Resources, Environment and Industry.  This section encompasses  of land, of which 20% are privately owned lands.  The strip of privately held land within BCNPMR is administered through the Ministry of Housing.  One parcel given to the location of the current ranger headquarters.  The remainder of the private holdings in the park consists of several parcels that comprise the majority of the park's windward shoreline.

Despite the two types of protected area within Bacalar Chico, the Fisheries Ministry is the de facto manager of the whole park as it furnishes the park's staff and budget. As with most parks in Belize, Bacalar Chico is co-managed by an NGO. A Memorandum of Understanding gives co-management responsibilities to the Green Reef Environmental Institute. Green Reef is legally responsible for education efforts involving the park, and is in part responsible for research and surveys carried out within the park, for legal lobbying, and for the procurement of grants. An advisory committee consisting of representatives from the government, environmental organizations, local businesses, and fishing and guiding cooperatives periodically meets for review and consultation on decisions regarding BCNPMR.

Wildlife and habitat
The park exhibits a high degree of diversity of habitats, encompassing swamps, grasslands, and various tropical forest assemblages including a medium semi-deciduous forest and a rare littoral, or beach, forest, which elsewhere in Belize has diminished due to coastal development.  BCNPMR's marine habitats include extensive tracts of mangrove and sea grass beds, patch and barrier reef, and the largest lagoon on the island of Ambergris caye, Laguna de Cantena.  The reef lies within the Mesoamerican Barrier Reef System, the world's second longest barrier reef after the Great Barrier Reef in Australia.  It stretches from the middle of the Yucatán Peninsula, down the entire coast of Belize, and terminates in Honduras.  Rocky Point, within Bacalar Chico, is the only location in Belize where the barrier reef meets the shore.  The point is ‘rocky’ because a fossilized Pleistocene reef lies exposed at the surface.

Within the park, all five species of cats native to Belize have been recorded, including the jaguar and puma.  The forests are also home to a population of the endangered White-lipped Peccary.  The mangroves and sea grass beds are home to manatees and crocodiles. Near Rocky Point lies the largest nesting beach for loggerhead and green sea turtles in Belize, and one of the largest for hawksbill turtles.

Conservation
The corals are still recovering from the collapse of the keystone grazer of algae, the long-spined sea urchin, which occurred in the 1980s and 90s and resulted in widespread coral die-offs across the Caribbean.  The corals themselves are subject to black and white band diseases, damage from hurricanes, and bleaching and reduced calcification brought on by increased sea surface temperatures and ocean acidification associated with global warming.  The reefs of Belize were subjected to the catastrophic global bleaching event of 1998.  Persisting high sea surface temperatures that year, coupled with the devastation of Hurricane Mitch, resulted in a 50% loss of living corals in some locations along the barrier reef.  As of January 1999, less than 1% of elkhorn, staghorn, and lettuce corals remained alive within the Basil Jones area (within Bacalar Chico), while 90% of boulder star coral was afflicted with black-band disease immediately after the bleaching event.  In fact, the threat posed by climate change was one of the primary reasons the UNESCO World Heritage committee awarded its designation to the seven marine protected areas in Belize.  In addition, BCNPMR is among the five marine protected areas in Belize that can be classified as overfished.

References 

 "Coastal and Marine Ecosystems- Belize." EarthTrends Country Profiles. 2003. Earth Trends. May 2007 
 Dotherow, Melanie, Wells, Susan, and Earl Young.  Bacalar Chico Marine Reserve and Wildlife Sanctuary Preliminary Draft Management Plan.  2005.
  Edmunds, Peter, and Robert Carpenter.  “Recovery of Diadema antillarum reduces macroalgal cover and increases abundance of juvenile corals on a Caribbean reef.”  Proceedings of the National Academy of Sciences 98 (2001): 5067-5071
 "Fishery and Aquaculture Country Profile- Belize." Fisheries and Aquaculture Department. Food and Agriculture Organization of the United Nations.  dom=countrysector&xml=FI-CP_BZ.xml.
 Gillet, Vincent. The Fisheries of Belize. Fisheries Centre, University of British Columbia. Vancouver: Fisheries Center Research Reports, 2003. 141–147.
 Grimshaw, Thom, and Guillermo Paz. The Revised Bacalar Chico National Park & Marine Reserve Management Plan. Greenreef Environmental Institute. San Pedro, 2004.
 “Petition to the World Heritage Committee Requesting Inclusion of Belize Barrier Reef System.”  2004.  Belize Institute of Environmental Law and Policy.
 Roberts, C.M, and N.C.V Polunin.  “Hol Chan- Demonstrating that marine reserves can be remarkably effective.”  Coral reefs 13 (1997): 90
 Smith, Gregory W.  “Coral bleaching and Mortality in the Basil Jones area of Bacalar Chico National Park and Marine Reserve, Belize.”  1998.
 World Heritage Nomination- IUCN Summary. Belize Barrier Reef System (Belize). UNESCO. 1996. May 2007 
 “World Heritage Sites- Belize.” Protected Areas Programme.  UNEP World Conservation Monitoring Centre. 

National parks of Belize
Parks in Belize
Marine reserves
Mesoamerican Barrier Reef System
Protected areas of Belize
Protected areas established in 1996
Nature conservation in Belize
1996 establishments in Belize